Landmark (formerly known as The Landmark) is a department store and supermarket run by Citysuper Incorporated, the holding company of the Landmark Corporation, owned by Enrique Cheng. It currently has multiple operational department stores and supermarkets across Metro Manila and one provincial branch located in Santa Rosa, Laguna.

History

The Landmark opened in 1988 on the ruins of the fire-ravaged Makati Supermarket (destroyed in 1985 and demolished soon after). It was founded by Teddy Keng, the son of the founders of Anson's Emporium (now Anson's), whose second store was located at A. Arnaiz Avenue south of the edifice. The Makati flagship branch was the third department store established within the Ayala Center after SM Makati and Rustan's, and is known for having some items lower priced than most department stores in Metro Manila. The Makati branch was redeveloped in 2013 with the addition of another sales floor. Mary Mother of Hope Chapel, a Roman Catholic chapel on the building's fifth level, was opened as well, serving as the home chapel for the Glorietta complex. The chapel's name was given by then-Archbishop of Manila Luis Antonio Cardinal Tagle.

In 2007, the TriNoma branch was opened to the public and is now an anchor store for TriNoma. This underwent expansion in 2015, thus becoming the largest Landmark branch ever built. The third floor of the expansion was opened to public on September 8, 2017, coinciding with the inauguration of Landmark's second chapel, which is the namesake of the first chapel in Makati, at the fourth level. The chapel has a seating capacity of 2,200 – which is the largest kind in Metro Manila.

In 2014, Landmark was selected to become the anchor store for Festival Alabang expansion and redevelopment in Filinvest City, Muntinlupa. The supermarket opened on July 28, 2017, and the department store opened on October 6, 2017. It is the first branch of Landmark to be opened in southern Metro Manila.

In mid-2019, The Landmark opened its first-ever provincial branch, located at Ayala Malls Solenad in Nuvali, Santa Rosa, Laguna.

The Landmark branch in Bonifacio Global City opened on October 1, 2021 with only the supermarket. Located at first two levels of Three Parkade parking building, it is the company's smallest store. The department store on the upper level later opened in December 2021.

Branches

Upcoming branches

See also
Ayala Center
TriNoma
Festival Alabang

References

External links
  - official Facebook Page
Metro Mall Online Store

Department stores of the Philippines